Asociația Clubul Sportiv Campionii Fotbal Club Argeș, commonly known as FC Argeș or Argeș Pitești, is a Romanian professional football club based in the city of Pitești, Argeș County, which competes in the Liga I.

The team was originally founded as Dinamo Pitești in 1953, and made its Romanian top tier debut in the 1961–62 season. In 1967, it changed its name to Argeș Pitești. The most successful period of "the White-Violets" was in the 1970s, when they won the national title twice. Three-time Romanian Footballer of the Year winner Nicolae Dobrin was part of the squad during that period, which turned him into a symbol of the club over the years.

FC Argeș has amassed over 40 seasons in the first league, and traditionally plays its home matches at the Nicolae Dobrin Stadium, which has a capacity of 15,000 seats.

History

Founding and early years (1953–1967)
On 6 August 1953, an order of the Ministry of Internal Affairs settled the birthday of Dinamo Pitești, the current formation FC Argeș, the name being taken after the older sister from Bucharest, Dinamo București. The new team from Pitești started its rise from the bottom, Campionatul Orășenesc, today Liga IV or Liga V, but the involvement of the local administration in bringing the best football players from the city to FC Argeș will be the main factor in the consecutive promotions of the club. The promotion to Divizia B occurred at the end of the 1958–1959 Divizia C season, and in the first year was very close to Divizia A promotion, but Dinamo occupied only the second place of the second series of Divizia B. The dream took shape for the football fans from Pitești in the following season. In 1961 Dinamo Pitești promoted on the first Romanian football stage under the command of coaches Ştefan Vasile and Tănase Dima. Three of the most well-known members of the squad were Ion Barbu, Florin Halagian and Nicolae Dobrin, the players who contributed the most at Dinamo's performance. 1961–62 Divizia A season was a tough one for the club which accused the shock of the debut and relegated back to Divizia B after only one year in the first league.

After only one season in Divizia B, Dinamo Pitești were promoted again in 1963. They would remain a constant presence on the first stage of the Romanian football, finishing 10th place in 1964 while also winning the Romanian Cup final, 8th in 1965, 4th in 1966 and 12th in 1967.

Golden era (1967–1983)

In the summer of 1967 the club changed its name from Dinamo Pitești to FC Argeș Pitești, a name that wrote history, remaining forever in the history of the Romanian football and in the remembering of the fans.

The first season with the new name was a great one for FC Argeș, which finished 2nd, with the same number of points as Steaua București, the champions of that season. The best ranking in club's history until then was followed only by a 12th place in 1969, a 10th place in 1970 and a 9th place in 1971.

Then in the 1971–72 Divizia A season nothing announced the great final success of "the White-Violets". In the first round the team had a bad debut, with a defeat (1–4) at SC Bacău and the tension within the team led to the dismissal of coach Titus Ozon, in his place was promoted a young coach, Florin Halagian, a former player of Dinamo Pitești. At his debut on August 29, 1971, being the youngest coach of Divizia A, FC Argeș won 2–1 against Rapid București, both goals scored by Jercan. At the end of the first part of the championship, FC Argeş was on the 4th place, with 18 points, following the teams: UTA Arad, SC Bacău and Universitatea Cluj. The winter preparations took place at Băile Herculane, followed by a strong tournament in the former East Germany, tournament that would help the team a lot in the second part of the championship. The second part was extraordinary, FC Argeș being defeated only twice (0–2, at home against Steagul Roșu Brașov and 0–1, at Cluj-Napoca, against CFR). There were followed by 9 games without defeats, in which Halagian played the big card several times. Thus, in the match against Politehnica Iași, he played in each half with a different line of midfielders, to everyone's surprise, to force the victory and to have fresh players until the end. In the penultimate stage (21 June 1972), at Pitești, FC Argeș defeated Crişul Oradea, becoming champion of Romania for the first time in its history, with one round before the end of the championship. The team played very offensive and ambitious, with an inspired Dobrin at the helm. The score was 4–1 (3–1) for "the White-Violets", through the goals scored by Dobrin (min 25 and 43), Prepurgel (min 28), M. Joita (min 83) and Tămaş for Crișul). In front of over 17,000 spectators, in the final round, although he had the title in his pocket, FC Argeș defeated Dinamo București, on 23 August Stadium, with the score of 3–2, through the goals scored by: Jercan (min 45), C. Radu I (min 55), Frățilă (min 89), respectively Lucescu (min 17) and Dumitrache (min 61) for Dinamo.

Following their 1972 Divizia A title, FC Argeș played in European Champion Clubs Cup. In the first round, the team from Pitești eliminated without big problems, 6–0 on aggregate, Aris Bonnevoie from Luxembourg, but then in the second round fate have brought them in their way Real Madrid, a team with 6 European Champion Clubs Cups at that moment and with big players like: Pirri, Ignacio Zoco, Santillana and Amancio, the coach was legendary Miguel Muñoz and president was Santiago Bernabéu himself. The match seemed to be a formality for Real Madrid but on the pitch FC Argeș made probably the best match in its entire history, a match in which a legend would be born, Nicolae Dobrin. Dobrin played absolutely fantastic wooing the audience and opponents, he scored for 1–0 in 24 minutes then Anzarda scored for 1–1 in 41 minutes. Prepurgel scored then for 2–1 in 62 minutes, goal followed by a multitude of occasions at the goal of the inspired García Remón. Santiago Bernabéu amazed by Dobrin's technics offered 2 million dollars and a floodlight facility for him, but Nicolae Ceaușescu refused, considering Dobrin a national treasure.
At Madrid, Real qualified hard after a goal scored in 87 minutes. The final score was 3–1, Santillana (17', 87') and Grande (47') scored for Real, Radu II (43') for FC Argeș.

The following seasons were oscillating for the team which finished 3rd in 1973, 8th in 1974, 7th in 1975 getting even to the 11th place in 1976 and 1977.

Then in the 1977–78 Divizia A season FC Argeș had a remarkable comeback like the last time and finished 2nd, again at the same number of points with the leaders, Steaua București, as in 1968.

1978–79 Divizia A season started under the sign of a good training and a desire to fructify the growing maturity of a group of young players, most of them raised in Pitești. Under the leadership of the same coach, Florin Halagian, helped by Leonte lanovschi and Constantin Oţet, transferred with a few days before the start of the championship. The goal of the club's leadership was to occupy one of the 1 to 5 places and to accumulate at least 18 points in the championship first part. FC Argeş started the championship in force, winning two games against Chimia Râmnicu Vâlcea and Politehnica Iași and ended up in the lead places. It was only in the 6th round when the club recorded the first defeat, 0–1, at Târgu Mureș, against ASA Târgu Mureș. The players were the subject of double efforts, most of them being part of the Romanian Olympic team, which managed, after many years, to defeat the Hungarian team at Pitești. At the end of the first part of the championship, FC Argeş was on the first position in the standings. A new player started successfully at Pitești team, Moiceanu, who soon became a secret weapon for the teammates and opponents. In the last round of the first part, FC Argeș won the match against Dinamo București (score 1–0) and became the champion of the first part with 10 matches won, a draw and 6 defeats, 25 goals scored and 17 received, totalizing 21 points, three more than the number proposed at the start of the championship.

The well-known sports journalist Laurențiu Dumitrescu wrote in Sportul newspaper, "... it was also in the autumn of 78 Dobrin's team, the team of that great talented player, who has been playing for more than 15 years with the 10 number shirt, the capable player – even at 31 years old – to decide any match in our championship (examples of testimonies: the matches against FC Baia Mare, on their own ground, and Steaua, away) to score goals of great spectacularity. When Dobrin was absent, intervened Iovănescu, an offensive midfielder who had an exceptional season, perhaps the best of his career, and he also took the role of puncher when the striker, Radu II, was injured. But was also Stancu's part of championship, who became at only 22 years old, the mature leader of the defense, defense which combines the experience of Ivan II with Cârstea's strength and the ambition of Mihai Zamfir."

On 24 June 1979, in front of 20,000 spectators, on the Dinamo Stadium in Bucharest, FC Argeș defeated Dinamo, after a high-tension match, with the score 4–3, through the goals scored by: Radu II (min 11 and 24), Doru Nicolae (min 69) and Dobrin (min 90) respectively Dragnea (min 6) and Dudu Georgescu (min 76, from penalty, and min 89) and won the Romanian title for the second time in its history.

After the game in Sportul newspaper, the well-known sports journalist Ioan Chirilă wrote, "The championship final, expected with an extraordinary interest, which massively diminished the number of spectators on all the other grounds, ended with the deserved victory of the Pitești people after a high-tension game, in which the thirst for victory of Dinamo's players and supporters received a veto from Dobrin, who offered to the audience and the viewers I do not know what number's game of his life, being the player who dominated the field from all points of view."

In 1978–79 UEFA Cup FC Argeș eliminated Panathinaikos and gave up hard in front of Valencia, 4–6 on aggregate.

Than the club finished on the podium for 2 times, in 1980 and 1981 and only on 10th place 1982. Then in the summer of 1982 Nicolae Dobrin, at 35 years old left FC Argeș for CS Târgoviște but the team didn't feel the shock too much and finished 4th in 1983. In the summer of 1983 Dobrin comeback to his big love, FC Argeș, but played only 5 matches and retired on 14 June 1983, in a match against Bihor Oradea, the team finishing in 5th place.

After Nicolae Dobrin (1983–2009)

The retirement of Nicolae Dobrin, the emblematic symbol of FC Argeș, it also meant the end of the great performance for the club. In the 80's the team become a middle of the leaderboard team, finishing frequently on 6th, 7th or 9th place, but managed however to reach 3 Balkans Cup finals in this period. Than at the end of the 80's and beginning of the 90's the team slipped even in the lower half everything cumulating with the relegation from Divizia A in 1992 after 29 years spent in the top-flight of the Romanian football.

Relegated in Liga II and with financial problems FC Argeș was taken over by Dacia, whose director was Constantin Stroe, who paid the debts. The club promoted back in 1994, finished 8th in 1995 and was again at 5 points away from relegation in 1996. Than in the next season the team comeback in the middle of the table.

1997–98 Divizia A season was the last peak of FC Argeș's history. The team finished 3rd and qualified for 1998–99 UEFA Cup where they eliminated teams like Dynamo Baku and İstanbulspor but were eliminated without problems by Celta de Vigo 0–8 on aggregate. This last presence in European Cups it was due to a formidable generation, the second most talented after the Dobrin's generation. This FC Argeș team had players like: Adrian Mutu, Bogdan Vintilă, Valentin Năstase, Iulian Crivac, Constantin Schumacher or Constantin Barbu.

FC Argeș continued its good seasons finishing 4th in 1999, than on 5th place in 2000 and 2001. Than from 2002 the team was a constant presence in the second half of the leaderboard, finishing in the best case on 10th place. This bad period ended with the second relegation in the club's history, this time after 13 years, at the end of the 2006–07 Liga I season.

The team promoted back after only one season in Liga II.

The "Romanian Calciopoli" and Bankruptcy (2009–2013)
"The White-Violet Eagles" finished 8th at their first season after the promotion, a season with good results and a solid style of playing. Than on 8 June 2009 a news would shock the world of the Romanian football, FC Argeș was relegated in Liga II, after National Anti-corruption Division, found that the owner of the team from that period, Cornel Penescu, tried to bribe more referees to "help" the team winning. This case was named by the press "Penescu Case" or the "Romanian Calciopoli".

After Cornel Penescu's arrest, his son, Andrei Penescu led the club, but the funding was practically non-existent and the club struggled to survive even in Liga II, finishing in the second half of the table. Then on 26 July 2013 it was announced that FC Argeș is bankrupt without any chance of rescue.

SCM Pitești and supporters' club (2013–2017)

After the bankruptcy of FC Argeș, people of Pitești have tried to bring football back to life.

The first project was SCM Pitești, a project initiated by Pitești Municipality which created a football section at SCM, the Sporting Club of the Municipality, in 2011, with 2 years before the end of FC Argeș, anticipating the bankruptcy of the club led at that time by Penescu's son, a club full of debts and with no future. The team promoted at Liga III after only one season and remained at that level until 2017 when they promoted to Liga II.

The supporters of FC Argeș encouraged the team until the very end, then after the bankruptcy they founded FC Argeș 1953 Piteşti, a phoenix club fully owned by FC Argeș supporters. The club won 2015–16 Liga IV-Argeș County and then the promotion play-off match against Recolta Stoicănești, Olt County champion, with the score of 5–2, but they couldn't join Liga III due to lack of funds and then dissolved the senior team.

Then Pitești Municipality has shown the intention to buy FC Argeș's brand and the fans have also announced that they support this initiative.

Rebirth and return to Liga I (2017–present)
On 16 June 2017, the Municipality of Pitești bought FC Argeș's brand for 550,000 RON. As a result of this association, the brand was transferred to SCM Pitești's football section, newly promoted to the second division, and the team came back to life four years after it was declared bankrupt. After promotion, the team spent 3 years in the second league. FC Argeș managed to earn promotion to the first division at the end of the 2019–20 season, after an 11-year break. Pitești narrowly earned a 2nd place, after Rapid held Turris-Oltul Turnu Măgurele to a draw in the seventh minute of extra time, a score at which Teleorman remained in the second league, and FC Argeș promoted directly.

In the first half of their comeback season, FC Argeș failed to impress, their winless streak leaving them last place in the league at the beginning of 2021. Things began to change after former player Andrei Prepeliță took over as manager, the team recording an 11 unbeaten league games run, and slowly crawling out of the relegation places to join the fight for a play-off place. With their unbeaten streak cut short by a 0–5 defeat against reigning champions CFR Cluj, FC Argeș kept their momentum, but never made it above 7th place. They missed a chance to make it through with a 1–1 draw against fellow play-off contenders Academica Clinceni and by the penultimate round, they missed the play-off qualification altogether following a 1–4 loss against Hermannstadt.

In the 2021-22 season, FC Argeș managed to secure a play-off spot on the final day of the regular season, finishing 4th after a 2-1 away win against FC Botoșani.

Youth program

Some notable names of the Romanian football were developed in the youth academy of FC Argeș, such as Nicolae Dobrin, Adrian Mutu, Ilie Bărbulescu, Marius Bilașco, Constantin Cârstea, Dănuț Coman, Iulian Crivac, Emil Dică, Valentin Năstase, Adrian Neaga, Marin Radu, Bogdan Stancu, Cristian Tănase, Constantin Stancu, Bogdan Vintilă or Ion Vlădoiu.

Stadium 
The club played its home matches on Stadionul Nicolae Dobrin from Pitești, a stadium with a capacity of 15,000 seats, the biggest of Argeș County.

Support
FC Argeș has many supporters in Romania and especially in Argeș County. The ultras groups of FC Argeș are known as Violet Republic, Brigada Vulturii București and Frați de weeknd.

Rivalries
FC Argeș does not have any important rivalries, but one of them is with Dinamo București and the other one is a local one against CS Mioveni, with the town of Mioveni being located at only 15 kilometres away from Pitești.

Honours

Domestic

Leagues

Liga I
Winners (2): 1971–72, 1978–79
Runners-up (2): 1967–68, 1977–78
Liga II
Winners (4): 1960–61, 1962–63, 1993–94, 2007–08
Runners-up (1): 2019–20
Liga III
Winners (1): 2016–17
Runners-up (1): 2015–16
Liga IV – Argeș County
Winners (1): 2011–12

Cups
Cupa României
Runners-up (1): 1964–65

European
Balkans Cup
Runners-up (3): 1983–84, 1984–85, 1987–88

Players

First-team squad

Other players under contract

Out on loan

Club officials

Board of officials

 Last updated: 6 September 2022
 Source:

Current technical staff

 Last updated: 8 March 2023
 Source:

European record

League history

Notable former players
The footballers enlisted below have had international cap(s) for their respective countries at senior level or at least 100 cap(s) for FC Argeș.

One-club men
  Constantin Cârstea
  Petre Ivan
  Constantin Olteanu
  Constantin Stancu
Romania
  Cristian Albeanu
  Bogdan Bănuță
  Constantin Barbu
  Ion Barbu
  Cristian Bălașa
  Ilie Bărbulescu
  Marius Bilașco
  Gheorghe Cacoveanu
  Ion Ceaușu
  Augustin Chiriță
  Alin Chița
  Dănuț Coman
  Narcis Coman
  Iulian Crivac
  Cristian Dancia
  Nicolae Dică
  Nicolae Diță
  Nicolae Dobrin
  Cătălin Doman
  Adrian Dulcea
  Augustin Eduard
  Constantin Frățilă
  Constantin Gâlcă
  Ionel Gane
  Ion Geolgău

  Adrian Iordache
  Sevastian Iovănescu
  Dumitru Ivan
  Radu Jercan
  Dan Lăcustă
  Bogdan Mara
  Andrei Mărgăritescu
  Cornel Mirea
  Viorel Moiceanu
  Dorinel Munteanu
  Alexandru Mustățea
  Adrian Mutu
  Nicolae Nagy
  Valentin Năstase
  Cosmin Năstăsie
  Adrian Neaga
  Cătălin Necula
  Spiridon Niculescu
  Marian Pană
  Cornel Pavlovici
  Marcel Pigulea
  Vasile Popa
  Marian Popescu
  Ștefan Preda
  Marius Predatu
  Andrei Prepeliță
  Ion Prepurgel
  Constantin Radu
  Marin Radu
  Marius Radu
  Ion Roșu

  Emil Săndoi
  Constantin Schumacher
  Dănuț Șomcherechi
  Andrei Speriatu
  Mircea Stan
  Vasile Stan
  Bogdan Stancu
  Dorian Ștefan
  Iulian Tameș
  Ciprian Tănasă
  Cristian Tănase
  Florin Tene
  Ion Țîrcovnicu
  Doru Toma
  Radu Troi
  Mihai Țurcan
  Iosif Varga
  Ion Vlădoiu
  Bogdan Vintilă
  Remus Vlad
  Dorel Zamfir
  Ilie Poenaru
  Mihai Zamfir
Argentina
  Elias Bazzi
Bosnia and Herzegovina
  Adnan Gušo

Notable former managers

 Marian Bondrea
 Constantin Cârstea
 Ştefan Coidum
 Nicolae Dobrin
 Florin Halagian
 Ion Lăpușneanu
 Virgil Mărdărescu
 Ion Moldovan
 Ion Nunweiller
 Titus Ozon
 Vasile Ștefan
 Constantin Teașcă

Notes

References

External links
 Official website
 Fans website
 Club profile on UEFA's official website

 
Football clubs in Argeș County
Pitești
Sport in Pitești
Association football clubs established in 1953
Liga I clubs
Liga II clubs
Liga III clubs
Liga IV clubs
1953 establishments in Romania